Flexbury is a village about 0.8 miles from Bude, in the civil parish of Bude–Stratton, north Cornwall, England. Described as a hamlet in 1887, residential properties have since been built to the coast at Crooklets beach. In 2018 it had an estimated population of 2290.

History 
The name "Flexbury" may mean "Felix’s earthwork". In 1887 it was described as a ″hamlet and seat, near Bude Haven″. Flexbury Park Methodist Church, opened in 1905 and is a grade II listed building. The church closed in 2008 and is now a residential property.

Flexbury has a history of flooding which was addressed by the Flexbury flood alleviation scheme.

References 

Bude
Villages in Cornwall